John Lecky (born 15 February 1960) is a Canadian rugby union player. He played in 18 matches for the Canada national rugby union team from 1982 to 1991, including two matches at the 1987 Rugby World Cup and two matches at the 1991 Rugby World Cup.

References

1960 births
Living people
Canadian rugby union players
Canada international rugby union players
Place of birth missing (living people)